Sir Peter David Gluckman    (born 8 February 1949) is a New Zealand scientist. Originally trained as a paediatrician, he served as the inaugural Chief Science Advisor to the New Zealand Prime Minister from 2009 to 2018. He is a founding member and was inaugural chair of the International Network for Government Science Advice, and is president of the International Science Council.

Scientific career
Born in Auckland, Gluckman attended Auckland Grammar School before studying paediatrics and endocrinology at the University of Otago, gaining an MBChB in 1971 and an MMedSc in 1976 from the University of Auckland. After further training at the University of California, San Francisco, he returned to New Zealand in 1980 to establish a group in perinatal physiology as a career fellow of the Medical Research Council of New Zealand.
 
In 1988, Gluckman was appointed Professor of Paediatric and Perinatal Biology and was head of the Department of Paediatrics. He obtained a DSc in 1989 from the University of Auckland. He then served as dean of the university's Faculty of Medical and Health Sciences whilst also heading the Research Centre for Developmental Medicine and Biology.

In 2001, Gluckman became the founding director of the Liggins Institute, and, a year later, director of the National Research Centre for Growth and Development (now called 'Gravida: National Centre for Growth and Development'), hosted by the University of Auckland. He stepped down from both positions in mid-2009 to assume his role as the first Chief Science Advisor to the New Zealand Prime Minister.  

In 2007 Gluckman was appointed programme director for Growth, Development and Metabolism at the Singapore Institute for Clinical Sciences, where he is currently chief scientific officer. He also holds honorary chairs at National University of Singapore and the University of Southampton. In 2014, he was appointed co-chair of the World Health Organization Commission on Ending Childhood Obesity (ECHO).

Gluckman has made research contributions to the fields of perinatal physiology and biology, developmental neuroscience and neuroprotection, paediatric and experimental endocrinology, as well as at the interface between ecological, developmental and evolutionary biology as applied to human health. He is the only New Zealander elected to the Institute of Medicine of the United States National Academies of Science, and is a Fellow of Academy of Medical Sciences of Great Britain.

Contributions to science advice and diplomacy 
In June 2009 Gluckman was appointed as the first Chief Science Advisor to the Prime Minister of New Zealand. This appointment was extended twice to end in June 2018. During this time, Gluckman made national and international contributions to science advice, science policy, and science diplomacy. He established departmental science advisory roles in major departments, and this group has been increasingly used by Government as a formal process of advice on matters relating to evidence and policy. He was given the additional appointment of Special Science Envoy for the Ministry of Foreign Affairs and Trade in 2010 to assist his role in science diplomacy.

Gluckman has explored extensively the principles of science advice through a blog, lectures, and in the scientific press. In 2012 he established and chaired the first formalised regional network of chief science advisors and equivalents of the Asia Pacific Economic Cooperation. He also established the Small Advanced Economies Initiative (SAEI) as a mechanism to bring together policy makers from small, advanced countries where science and innovation are core tools of development, to work collaboratively on shared issues and ideas. In 2013 he was requested by the International Council for Science (ICSU; now the International Science Council) to consider the development of an international network of science advisors. This led Gluckman to host and chair the inaugural Science Advice to Governments Conference, convened by the International Council for Science, in August 2014 in Auckland, New Zealand. It was the first global meeting of high-level science advisors, academies, and academics.

In June 2018, Gluckman stepped down from his role as the Prime Minister's Chief Science Advisor, and was replaced by Juliet Gerrard. On 5 July he was elected to the position of president-elect of the International Science Council at its inaugural meeting in Paris. 

In March 2020, Gluckman became the director of the newly established Koi Tū: The Centre for Informed Futures, a University of Auckland Faculty of Arts research centre.

In November 2022, Gluckman criticised the National Party leader Christopher Luxon's proposed Young Offender Military Academies, citing the failure of the previous Fifth National Government's boot camp programme for young offenders. As Chief Science Adviser, Gluckman had published a report in 2018 where he concluded that boot camps and other "scared straight" programmes did not work and instead increased crimes. Instead of boot camps, Gluckman advocated addressing juvenile delinquency and abuse through early intervention programmes, targeted mental health services, and complimentary services focusing on the Māori and Pasifika communities.

Honours and awards
Gluckman is a Fellow of the Royal Society of London, an honour bestowed on just 42 New Zealand-born scientists since the Society's establishment in 1660. In 2001, Gluckman received New Zealand's top science award, the Rutherford Medal.

In 2004 Gluckman was named as The New Zealand Herald New Zealander of the Year, also winning the KEA/NZTE World Class New Zealander Award in 2006.

In the 1997 Queen's Birthday Honours, Gluckman was appointed a Companion of the New Zealand Order of Merit, for services to medicine. He was promoted to Distinguished Companion of the New Zealand Order of Merit, for services to medicine, in the 2008 New Year Honours. In 2009, following the restoration of titular honours by the New Zealand government, he accepted redesignation as a Knight Companion of the New Zealand Order of Merit.

In the 2015 Queen's Birthday Honours, Gluckman was appointed a Member of the Order of New Zealand, the country's highest civilian honour, restricted to 20 living New Zealanders.

Gluckman received the American Association for the Advancement of Science (AAAS) Award for Science Diplomacy, in 2016. In 2019 he was named New Zealand Communicator of the Year by BlacklandPR.

Books
Gluckman, Peter; Hanson, Mark (2019), Ingenious: The Unintended Consequences of Human Innovation, Cambridge, MA: Harvard University Press,

References

External links
 The Liggins Institute website - Professor Sir Peter Gluckman bio

1949 births
Living people
New Zealand paediatricians
New Zealand Jews
Knights Companion of the New Zealand Order of Merit
Members of the New Zealand Order of Merit
New Zealand Fellows of the Royal Society
University of Auckland alumni
Academic staff of the University of Auckland
University of Otago alumni
People educated at Auckland Grammar School
Recipients of the Rutherford Medal
Fellows of the Royal Society of New Zealand
Members of the National Academy of Medicine